Spite may refer to:
 Spite (sentiment), to intentionally annoy, hurt, or upset without self-benefit
 Spite (game theory), a phenomenon in fair division economics problems
 Spite (punk band), a hardcore punk band from Michigan
 Spite (deathcore band), a deathcore band from Southern California
 Spite plateau, a baseline in the abundance of lithium found in old stars orbiting the galactic halo

See also
 Spite fence, an overly-tall fence erected between two adjacent lots
 Spite house, a building constructed specifically because someone does not want it there
 Cutting off the nose to spite the face
 Appeal to spite
 Spiteful (disambiguation)
 Warspite (disambiguation)
 Spight